RPE is a three letter acronym, which can refer to:
 Radiation protection expert
 Rapid palatal expander, an orthodontic device widen the palate
 Rating of perceived exertion, a scale for assessing perceived exertion during exercise
 IBM Rational Publishing Engine, a document generation solution
 Red Pine Elementary in Eagan, Minnesota, USA
 Respiratory protective equipment
 Retinal pigment epithelium — layer of the retina
 Revenue Per Employee, a ratio used to compare business efficiency
  Ribulose-phosphate epimerase, human gene for a protein that reversibly converts ribulose to xyulose
 Rocket Propulsion Establishment, UK-based military research site at RAF Westcott
 Russet Potato Exchange in Bancroft, Wisconsin, USA
 Radical Performance Engines a UK company that builds Race car and tuned Hayabusa Motorcycle Engines